The Mercedes-Benz 300 SEL 6.3 was a full-sized luxury performance car built by Mercedes Benz from 1968 to 1972. It featured the company's powerful 6.3-litre M100 V8 from the flagship 600 (W100) limousine installed in the normally six-cylinder powered (but still premium)  Mercedes-Benz 300 SEL (W109). The result was a nearly 2-ton sports sedan with muscle car performance.  At the time of its release it was one of the world's fastest four-door cars.

A total of 6,526 300 SEL 6.3s were produced, and though quite costly to maintain are very collectible today.

Concept 

The car started out as a private venture in 1966 by company engineer Erich Waxenberger. His principle was simple: take the powerful 6.3 litre Mercedes-Benz M100 V8 from the massive 600 saloon and limousine, and fit it into the engine bay of the top-end 6-cylinder 300 SEL W109 model. The result was an impressive level of performance for the era and for the style of automobile. 

The company turned the prototype into a production model, introduced at the Geneva Motor Show in March 1968. This not only enhanced Mercedes-Benz's reputation for performance vehicles, languishing since the demise of the iconic Gullwing and Mercedes-Benz 300 SL roadsters of the 1950s, but made better use of the M100 engine production facilities. By the end of line's production the 6,500 built for the 300 SEL 6.3 far outnumbered the 2,700 turned out for the 600.

Later, the company also fitted new, smaller V8 engines into the W109 series. The 300 SEL 4.5 was only available in the United States, while the 280 SE 3.5 Coupé could also be ordered in Europe.

In 1975, the Mercedes-Benz 450 SEL 6.9 was introduced as a 300 SEL 6.3 successor with a larger displacement engine for more power and various modifications to the equipment.

Features 

The 300 SEL 6.3 was an extremely luxurious vehicle for its era.  Standard features included air suspension, ventilated 4-wheel power disc brakes, power windows, central locking and power steering. Air conditioning, power sunroof, audio tape deck, and rear window curtains, writing tables, and reading lamps were available as options.

Engine
 6.332-litre V8 with Bosch  fuel injection, 
  at 4000 rpm, 300 HP SAE gross at 4100 rpm
  at 2800 rpm,  SAE at 3000 rpm
 Max. engine speed: 5250 rpm

Performance 
 0-: 6.6 seconds
 0- : 14.6 seconds
 Standing quarter-mile (~400 m) : 14.2 seconds
 Top speed :  (factory figure)

Test results
Auto, Motor und Sport published the following test results for the 300 SEL 6.3 in March 1968:

 0–: 4.3 s 
 0–: 6.5 s 
 0–: 9.3 s 
 0–: 13.0 s 
 0–: 17.3 s 
 0–: 22.8 s 
 0–: 31.0 s 
 0–: 27.1 s
 Top Speed:

Motor racing 

Originally not intended for motor sports, a few cars were built for racing, usually with the engine enlarged to 6.8 litres or more. The car had an impressive, but short-lived racing career, due to the lack of suitable tyres, or rule changes preventing the use of them.

AMG, now the high-performance division of Mercedes-Benz but back then a small local tuning workshop founded by two former Mercedes engineers, modified a makeshift car to compete in racing events, nicknamed "Red Sow" (German: Rote Sau), which finished 2nd in the 24 Hours of Spa in 1971. At the end of its racing career the 6,834 cc engine yielded . The car was sold to French company Matra who used it for tests of jet fighter landing gear. Five examples were built: three racers and two test cars.

References

External links
 The International M-100 Group (officially recognized by Daimler-Benz)
 Mercedes W108/W109 enthusiast site
 Finnish Waxenberger in Keimola-racetrack
 Petrolicious: This is the Grandfather of Every German Sports Sedan – retrospective of the 300 SEL 6.3
 Renaissance der "Roten Sau"

300 SEL 6.3
Mercedes-Benz racing cars
Muscle cars